cis-Dichlorobis(bipyridine)ruthenium(II) is the coordination complex with the formula RuCl2(bipy)2, where bipy is 2,2'-bipyridine.  It is a dark green diamagnetic solid that is a precursor to many other complexes of ruthenium, mainly by substitution of the two chloride ligands.  The compound has been crystallized as diverse hydrates.

Synthesis and structure
The complex is prepared by heating a DMF solution of ruthenium trichloride and bipyridine.

With octahedral coordination geometry, the complex exists exclusively as the chiral cis isomer. The corresponding Ru(III) salts are also known.

References

Ruthenium complexes
Coordination complexes
Ruthenium(II) compounds
Bipyridines
Pyridine complexes
Chloro complexes